Albion Center is an unincorporated community in Albion Township, Wright County, Minnesota, United States.  The community is located along Wright County Road 6 near 20th Street NW.  Nearby places include Annandale, Maple Lake, West Albion, and Albion Wildlife Management Area.  Wright County Roads 5, 7, and 37 are also in the immediate area.

References

Unincorporated communities in Minnesota
Unincorporated communities in Wright County, Minnesota